This is a partial list of country houses in Derbyshire which have been demolished:

 Appleby Hall, demolished 1920s
 Aston Lodge, Aston-on-Trent, demolished 1933 (see Joseph Greaves)
 Chaddesden Hall, Chaddesden, demolished 1920s
 Chilcote Hall
 Drakelow Hall, demolished (see Gresley baronets)
 Darley Abbey Hall, demolished 1962
 Derwent Hall, drowned by flooding 1943
 Doveridge Hall, demolished 1938 (see Cavendish baronets)
 Eggington Hall, demolished 1955
 Errwood Hall, demolished 1934
 Etwall Hall, demolished 1952
 Farnah Hall, demolished 1940
 Glapwell Hall, demolished 1950s (see National Coal Board)
 Glossop Hall
 Hopwell Hall, demolished after a fire in 1957
 Kirk Hallam Hall, demolished 1972 
 Markeaton Hall, demolished 1964
 Padley Hall, demolished 19th century
 Oldcotes Manor, demolished around 1710
 Osmaston Hall, Osmaston, Derby, demolished 1938 (see Wilmot baronets)
 Osmaston Manor, Osmaston, Derbyshire Dales, demolished 1964 (see Walker-Okeover baronets)
 Shallcross Hall, demolished 1968
 Shipley Hall, demolished 1948
 Snelston Hall, demolished 1953
 Spondon Hall
 Willesley Hall, demolished 1952
 Wirksworth Hall, demolished 1922
 Wingerworth Hall, demolished 1927

See also 
 List of estates of the nobility in Derbyshire

References

England's lost country houses http://www.lostheritage.org.uk/lh_complete_list.html

 Derbyshire
Houses in Derbyshire
History of Derbyshire
Lost houses of Derbyshire